Kristopher Carlos Joseph (born December 17, 1988) is a Canadian professional basketball player for Ottawa Blackjacks of the Canadian Elite Basketball League (CEBL). He played for the Syracuse Orange men's basketball team from 2008 to 2012. He was selected in the second round of the 2012 NBA Draft by the Boston Celtics with the 51st pick overall.

Early years
Joseph was born and raised in Montreal, Quebec, where he grew up in the working-class neighbourhood of Cote-des-Neiges north of downtown. Joseph first picked up a basketball in Grade 2 but was forced to shoot on garbage cans with his older brother Maurice. A court was eventually erected in Cote-des-Neiges and the brothers battled for hours.

High school career
Joseph played in Maurice's shadow for a number of years as the older star gained prominence at noted Montreal-area prep school Champlain St. Lambert College. Kris struggled at first against elite competition, getting cut from his club team at the age of 14.
He worked on his game, grew to 6-foot-6 and became a star for Sun Youth, a club-team powerhouse in the Montreal Basketball League. As a tenth-grader, he led the Quebec provincial team to a silver medal at the 2005 Canada Games. He played for his high school team at Mont-Royal high school, the Mount-Royal Mustangs.

On a recommendation from youth coach Henry Wong, who thought Joseph needed an athletic and academic challenge, Joseph's mother agreed to let him leave Montreal in 2006 to complete two years of high school at Archbishop Carroll in Washington, D.C.

As a senior, Joseph led Archbishop Carroll to a 26–11 record, including a 21-point, five rebound, three assist and three block effort in the Washington Catholic Athletic Conference (WCAC) Tournament in a 65–55 win over Our Lady of Good Counsel. Joseph was also invited to play in the Baltimore All-Stars vs. U.S. All-Stars Exhibition in April. That season, Joseph would go on to earn 2008 second team honors from the Washington Post. He played AAU basketball with the DC Assault.

Considered a three-star recruit by Rivals.com, Joseph was listed as the No. 17 small forward and the No. 113 player in the nation in 2008.

College career

2008–09
Joseph would see early playing time, including seven points in 22 minutes in an 85–51 rout of Le Moyne on November 16, 2008  and a 13-point six rebound effort in an 86–66 victory against Oakland University on November 22, 2008. On November 24, 2008, Joseph's 10 points and five rebounds helped then-unranked Syracuse upset then-No. 18 Florida, 89–83, in the semi-finals of the CBE Classic.

After an injury to Paul Harris, Joseph would receive the first start of his career against South Florida on January 2, 2009, scoring seven points and adding three rebounds.

2009–10
Joseph would become a key reserve in his second year at Syracuse. In SU's Big East opener against Seton Hall on December 29, 2009, Joseph scored 16 points, including 8-of-9 shooting from the free throw line in an 80–73 win. On January 6, 2010 against Memphis, Joseph scored 15 second half points to go along with nine rebounds in a 74–57 win.

Joseph finished with averages of 11.0 points and 5.4 rebounds on the season, and was named the Big East Conference Sixth Man of the Year.

2010–11
Joseph gained national prominence as a go-to scorer for the Orange during his junior year. He was named to the Wooden Award Preseason Top 50 list and improved his numbers across the board, leading Syracuse in scoring at 14.3 points per game and placing second in rebounding (5.2) and steals (1.5). He was named to the All-Big East third team, the first Canadian to receive the honour since fellow Montrealer Bill Wennington in 1985.

2011–12
Joseph was once again named to the Wooden Award Preseason Top 50 list as a senior. His final season started off with a flourish as he was named the Big East Player of the Week after leading his Syracuse Orange to the NIT Season Tip Off Championship. Joseph was named Most Outstanding Player of the tournament with averages of 19.0 points, 9.5 rebounds and 3.5 steals in wins against Virginia Tech and Stanford.

He led the Orange in scoring during the regular season (13.4 ppg) and received an array of post-season awards, including a spot on the 2012 All-Big East First Team. Joseph is the first Canadian-born player ever to be named to the first team of that conference. He was named an AP Honorable Mention All-American  and also earned spots on the USBWA All District II team as well as the NABC All-District 5 First Team. Additionally, Joseph was one of 15 post-season finalists for the Wooden Award, making him among the most decorated Canadians ever to play NCAA Division I basketball.

With his 15 points against Manhattan on November 14, 2011, Joseph became the 55th player at Syracuse to score 1,000 points. He concluded his storied career with 10 points, two rebounds and 3 steals in Syracuse's 77–70 loss to Ohio State in the Elite Eight.

Professional career

Boston Celtics
Joseph was selected in the second round of the 2012 NBA Draft by the Boston Celtics with the 51st pick. On July 3, 2012, Joseph signed a contract with the Celtics.

On July 5, 2012 the Boston Celtics announced that Joseph was added to their roster for the 2012 Orlando and Las Vegas NBA Summer League's. On October 24, Kris Joseph officially made the Celtics' 15-man roster. He was sent to the Maine Red Claws of the NBA D-League for several assignments during his time with the Celtics. On January 6, 2013, he was waived by the Celtics. On February 6, 2013, Joseph was reacquired by the Maine Red Claws.

Brooklyn Nets
On February 11, 2013, Joseph was traded to the Springfield Armor for James Mays. He signed a 10-day contract with the Brooklyn Nets on April 2, 2013. On April 12, 2013, he was signed for the remainder of the season.

Joseph was traded to the Boston Celtics on July 12, 2013 along with Keith Bogans, Kris Humphries, MarShon Brooks and Gerald Wallace as well as three first round picks in a blockbuster deal that sent Celtics stars Kevin Garnett, Paul Pierce and Jason Terry to the Nets. It was the first time two players named Kris were traded with each other. He was one of two players traded to the team that originally drafted them: Joseph was drafted by Boston in 2012 and Brooks was drafted by Boston in the 2011 NBA Draft. On July 15, 2013, Joseph was waived by the Celtics.

Orlando Magic
In September 2013, Joseph joined the Orlando Magic for their training camp. However, he was waived on October 25.

France
On November 10, 2013, Joseph signed a contract with the French team Élan Chalon.

On June 30, 2014, JDA Dijon announced they had signed Joseph for the 2014–15 season.

On August 1, 2015, he signed with Orléans Loiret Basket for the 2015–16 season.

Canada
On February 22, 2018, Joseph signed with the Niagara River Lions of  the National Basketball League of Canada. He averaged 16.2 points, 5 rebounds and 3 assists per game.

Portugal
On August 13, 2018, Joseph signed with S.L. Benfica of the Portuguese Basketball League. Shortly after, on September 17, he rescinded with the Portuguese side by mutual agreement after a severe injury.

Back to France
On September 17, 2019, Joseph signed with ADA Blois Basket 41 of the LNB Pro B.

Back to Canada
On June 10, 2021, Joseph signed with the Ottawa Blackjacks of the Canadian Elite Basketball League.

NBA career statistics

Regular season

|-
| style="text-align:left;"| 
| style="text-align:left;"|  Boston
| 6 || 0 || 4.0 || .182 || .000 || .750 || 0.8 || 0.2 || 0.0 || 0.0 || 1.2
|-
| style="text-align:left;"| 
| style="text-align:left;"|  Brooklyn
| 4 || 0 || 7.5 || .000 || .000 || .500 || 0.5 || 0.0 || 0.8 || 0.0 || 0.5
|- class="sortbottom"
| style="text-align:left;"| Career
| style="text-align:left;"| 
| 10 || 0 || 5.4 || .143 || .000 || .625 || 0.7 || 0.1 || 0.3 || 0.0 || 0.9

See also

List of Canadians in the National Basketball Association

References

External links

 Celtics Summer League profile
 Eurocup profile
 FIBA.com profile

1988 births
Living people
All-American college men's basketball players
Anglophone Quebec people
Basketball players from Montreal
Black Canadian basketball players
Boston Celtics draft picks
Boston Celtics players
Brooklyn Nets players
Canadian expatriate basketball people in France
Canadian expatriate basketball people in Italy
Canadian expatriate basketball people in the United States
Canadian expatriate sportspeople in Portugal
Canadian men's basketball players
Canadian sportspeople of Trinidad and Tobago descent
Élan Chalon players
JDA Dijon Basket players
Lega Basket Serie A players
Maine Red Claws players
National Basketball Association players from Canada
New Basket Brindisi players
People from Côte-des-Neiges–Notre-Dame-de-Grâce
S.L. Benfica basketball players
ADA Blois Basket 41 players
Small forwards
Syracuse Orange men's basketball players
Archbishop Carroll High School (Washington, D.C.) alumni